Ersin Destanoğlu (born 1 January 2001) is a Turkish professional footballer who plays as a goalkeeper for Süper Lig club Beşiktaş.

Club career
Destanoğlu played 18 games at 2018–19 season of TFF U-19 Elite Development League. Following the departure of Loris Karius, Destanoğlu became the first choice goalkeeper in June 2020. On 13 June 2020, Destanoğlu made his Süper Lig debut at week 27 encounter of 2019–20 season, which ended 2–1 in favour of Antalyaspor.

Destanoğlu saved 6 shots on target, including one from a penalty shot from Chuba Akpom, ended 3–1 for home side PAOK at second qualifying round of 2020–21 Champions League qualifying stage, on 25 August 2020.

He was suspended following a collusion outside the box with opponent's striker Muhammet Demir, on Süper Lig encounter against Gaziantep on 6 November 2020, being the first Beşiktaş goalkeeper shown a red card since Rüştü Reçber's card given in 2007.

On 4 April 2021, Destanoğlu saved a penalty taken Swedish forward Isaac Thelin in a game against Kasımpaşa, held at Recep Tayyip Erdoğan Stadium, ended 1–0 for Kasımpaşa. Because of this, Destanoğlu became the first goalkeeper to save a penalty  in a Süper Lig game since 2015–16 when Tolga Zengin saved one.

Career statistics

1.Includes Turkish Cup.
2.Includes UEFA Champions League, UEFA Europa League and UEFA Conference League.
3.Includes Turkish Super Cup.

Honours
Beşiktaş
TFF U19 League: 2017–18
Süper Lig: 2020–21
Türkiye Kupası: 2020–21
Süper Kupa: 2021

Individual
IFFHS World Youth (U20) Team: 2020

References

External links
 Ersin Destanoğlu at TFF
 

2001 births
Turkish footballers
Turkey youth international footballers
Association football goalkeepers
Beşiktaş J.K. footballers
Süper Lig players
Footballers from Istanbul
Living people